The Johan Cruyff Shield is a football trophy in the Netherlands named after Dutch footballer Johan Cruyff, also often referred to as the Dutch Super Cup. The winner is decided in one match only, played by the winner of the national football league, Eredivisie, and the winner of the national KNVB Cup. In the event of a team winning both the Eredivisie and the KNVB Cup, the Johan Cruyff Shield will be contested between that team and the runner up in the national league.

The trophy 
The trophy is a silver plate with a 60-centimetre diameter. It is similar to the trophies received by the champions of the Eredivisie. The engraved text on the trophy is as follows:
 Border, top: "Johan Cruijff Schaal XV" (or: "Johan Cruyff Trophy X", so Cruijff with 'ij' as opposed to the international spelling using a 'y' and a number in Roman numerals)
 Centre: "KNVB 31-7-2008" (KNVB standing for "Koninklijke Nederlandse Voetbal Bond" or "Royal Dutch Football Association" followed by the date of the match)
 Border, bottom: "Ajax – FC Twente" (the teams playing the match, with the champion of the national league named second)

History

Super Cup 
The first Super Cup match was played on 25 June 1949. The league champions SVV beat cup winners Quick 1888 2–0.

The Dutch FA brought back the competition in 1991 under the name PTT Telecom Cup, with the match always being played in the De Kuip stadium in Rotterdam. After three years, sponsor PTT Telecom retreated and the name Super Cup was reinstated.

Johan Cruyff Shield 
In 1996 the format was changed to the current set-up and played in the Amsterdam Arena under the name Johan Cruyff Schaal (Dutch for Johan Cruyff Shield).

In 2003, the supporters of both teams, namely FC Utrecht and PSV Eindhoven, were rather unhappy with the set-up and stayed away from the stadium. The Utrecht fans complained about protocols concerning their travel to Amsterdam (strict rules imposed for the threat of hooliganism) and the PSV fans were dissatisfied with the seats assigned to them. Only 700 of the 13,000 available tickets were sold. The prize money in 2003 amounted to €135,000. The contestants in 2004 were Ajax and FC Utrecht. Utrecht won with a final score of 4–2 after trailing 1–2 up until the 85th minute of the match. Thirty-three thousand spectators witnessed the most remarkable comeback in the trophy's history.

Because PSV won both the national championship and the cup in 2005, Ajax (who had finished second in the league) formed the opposition and won 2–1. It was only the fourth home-victory of Ajax over PSV in ten years.

Starting from 2017, the match is played in the stadium of the Eredivisie champions.

Results

Super Cup

Johan Cruyff Shield

Winners by club 
The performance of various clubs is shown in the following table:

References

External links 

Netherlands – List of Super Cup Finals, RSSSF.com

 
Netherlands
Recurring sporting events established in 1949
Football competitions in the Netherlands
Johan Cruyff